George Faulkner Wetherbee, R.I., R.O.I. (Cincinnati, 1851–1920) was an American painter.  He lived for most of his life in England.

Born in Cincinnati, his early talent was evident and he was sent to Europe to study in art schools at Antwerp, then London. He then lived in various countries on the continent of Europe, and frequently visited the West Indies to paint there.  He achieved success in his 40s, with recognition by the distinguished London art societies, and his mastery of colour and light were highly acclaimed. He worked in both oils and watercolor, mostly showing idyllic landscapes with small figures of young people.  He also made several commercial rural scenes in the 1890s, immediately after his success.

Books about the artist 

 Mona Wetherbee van der Weyd, Henry van der Weyd, David Crook (Eds) (1999). George's Letters Home. (His letters to relatives in the U.S.)

1851 births
1920 deaths
19th-century American painters
19th-century American male artists
American male painters
20th-century American painters
Landscape artists
20th-century American male artists